Stefan Edberg defeated Magnus Larsson 7–6(7–4), 6–1 to win the 1995 Qatar Open singles competition. Edberg was the defending champion.

Seeds

  Stefan Edberg (champion)
  Michael Stich (semifinals)
  Magnus Larsson (final)
  Jacco Eltingh (first round)
  Alexander Volkov (first round)
  Bernd Karbacher (first round)
  Paul Haarhuis (first round)
  Guy Forget (second round)

Draw

Finals

Section 1

Section 2

External links
 Main Singles Draw

1995 Qatar Open
1995 ATP Tour
Qatar Open (tennis)